Rosslea or Roslea is a small village in County Fermanagh, Northern Ireland, near the border with County Monaghan in the Republic of Ireland. It stands on the Finn River and is beset by small natural lakes. Roslea Forest, also known as Spring Grove Forest, is nearby. In the 2011 Census it had a population of 528 people.

History
There were several incidents in the Rosslea area during the Anglo-Irish War. On 21 February 1921, a group of Special Constables and Ulster Volunteers burned ten Irish nationalists' homes and a priest's house in Rosslea as revenge for the shooting of a Special Constable. A UVF member mistakenly shot and killed himself during the attacks. On the night of 21 March, the Irish Republican Army attacked the homes of up to sixteen Special Constables in the Rosslea district, killing three and wounding others. IRA volunteers were also wounded and one was captured.

Rosslea was one of several Catholic border villages in Fermanagh that would have been transferred to the Irish Free State had the recommendations of the Irish Boundary Commission been enacted in 1925.

During The Troubles in Rosslea several people were killed. Incidents that led to two or more deaths include

2 June 1972 – The Provisional IRA killed two British Army soldiers in a land mine attack.
11 February 1980 – two RUC officers (Winston Howe and Joseph Rose) were killed and a soldier was badly injured when the IRA detonated an 800 lb (360 kg) landmine on the main Rosslea–Lisnaskea road.
See: Attack on Derryard checkpoint.

Transport
Ulsterbus route 95C provides a commuter service to Enniskillen with one journey to the county town in the morning returning in the evening. There is no service on Saturdays and Sundays. Onward connections are available at Enniskillen.  Due to proposed cuts to bus services route 95C may be withdrawn in 2015.

Sport
The local Gaelic football club is Roslea Shamrocks, founded in 1888, they are the third most successful club in County Fermanagh (after Teemore Shamrocks and Lisnaskea Emmetts).

2001 Census
Roslea is classified as a small village or hamlet by the NI Statistics and Research Agency (NISRA) (i.e. with population between 500 and 1,000 people).
On Census day (29 April 2001) there were 554 people living in Roslea. Of these:
25.0% were aged under 16 years and 16.8% were aged 60 and over
46.8% of the population were male and 53.3% were female
97.5% were from a Catholic background and 2.0% were from a Protestant background
10.6% of people aged 16–74 were unemployed

2011 Census
On Census Day (27 March 2011) the usually resident population of Rosslea Settlement was 528 accounting for 0.03% of the NI total.
 99.43% were from the white (including Irish Traveller) ethnic group;
 93.18% belong to or were brought up in the Catholic religion and 5.11% belong to or were brought up in a 'Protestant and Other Christian (including Christian related)' religion; and
 6.82% indicated that they had a British national identity, 66.86% had an Irish national identity and 23.11% had a Northern Irish national identity*.
Respondents could indicate more than one national identity
 
On Census Day 27 March 2011, in Rosslea Settlement, considering the population aged 3 years old and over:
 
 29.53% had some knowledge of Irish;
 0.39% had some knowledge of Ulster-Scots; and
 4.13% did not have English as their first language.

Education
 St Eugene's College

References

External links
 Enniskillen.com
 Culture Northern Ireland

Villages in County Fermanagh
Townlands of County Fermanagh